Henry "Percy" Dawson served in many roles in professional baseball.

He was a minor league baseball team owner, heading the Richmond Colts and Portsmouth Truckers, and scout for the New York Yankees, signing – among others – pitcher Jim Coates. He also served as the head of the Yankees' farm system in the Virginia area.

He also managed Richmond in 1925, leading them to a league championship.

While owner of Portsmouth, Dawson was involved in a dispute with the Boston Red Sox over future Hall of Fame third baseman Pie Traynor. Red Sox owner Ed Barrow convinced Traynor to join Portsmouth, saying that if the third baseman performed well there, he would join the Red Sox, as the Boston team and Portsmouth had a gentleman's agreement, wherein Portsmouth served as something of a farm team for the Red Sox.

However, the Truckers were still an independent team and, despite the informal agreement, were able to do anything they wished with Traynor, including selling him to another team. In September 1920, they sold him to the Pittsburgh Pirates, infuriating Burrow. "I hit the ceiling. I grabbed the phone and called Dawson and called him everything I could think of", Burrow said. Washington Senators owner Clark Griffith, too, was unhappy, claiming he thought his team would gain access to Traynor.

Incident
In July 1934, while business and general manager of the Norfolk Tars, Dawson was arrested, along with team manager Bill Skiff and pitcher Ray White, for striking a police officer and resisting arrest during a squabble over a disputed home run call. He was neither fined or imprisoned.

References

Minor league baseball managers
New York Yankees scouts
Minor league baseball executives
Year of birth missing
Place of birth missing
Year of death missing